The APC United Late Model Series is a late model stock car racing series competing at short track ovals in Ontario, Canada.

Background
The series was founded in 2015 with the purpose of revitalizing late model stock car racing at paved short oval tracks in Southern Ontario. The touring series consists of seven to ten races per year running from May until September and has competed at six different Ontario race tracks.

The first race took place on May 23, 2015 at Sunset Speedway and was won by Dwayne Baker. The series has a title sponsorship with APC Auto Parts Centres, a Canadian auto parts supplier and retail chain.

Tracks
The following are the tracks which have been or are currently used in the APC United Late Model Series:

Champions

Rookies of the Year

See also
 NASCAR Pinty's Series
 OSCAAR - Ontario Stock Car Association of Asphalt Racers
 Lucas Oil Sportsman Cup

References

External links
 APC United Late Model Series Official Site

Stock car racing series
Auto racing series in Canada
Motorsport in Canada
Recurring sporting events established in 2015